The Great Rift Valley is a series of contiguous geographic trenches, approximately  in total length, that runs from Lebanon in Asia to Mozambique in Southeast Africa. While the name continues in some usages, it is rarely used in geology as it is considered an imprecise merging of separate though related rift and fault systems.

This valley extends northward for 5,950 km through the eastern part of Africa, through the Red Sea, and into Western Asia. Several deep, elongated lakes, called ribbon lakes, exist on the floor of this rift valley: Lakes Malawi, Rudolf and Tanganyika are examples of such lakes. The region has a unique ecosystem and contains a number of Africa's wildlife parks.

The term Great Rift Valley is most often used to refer to the valley of the East African Rift, the divergent plate boundary which extends from the Afar Triple Junction southward through eastern Africa, and is in the process of splitting the African Plate into two new and separate plates. Geologists generally refer to these evolving plates as the Nubian Plate and the Somali Plate.

Theoretical extent

Today these rifts and faults are seen as distinct, although connected, but originally, the Great Rift Valley was thought to be a single feature that extended from Lebanon in the north to Mozambique in the south, where it constitutes one of two distinct physiographic provinces of the East African mountains. It included what today is called the Lebanese section of the Dead Sea Transform, the Jordan Rift Valley, Red Sea Rift and the East African Rift.  These rifts and faults were formed 35 million years ago.

Asia

The northernmost part of the Rift corresponds to the central section of what is called today the Dead Sea Transform (DST) or Rift. This midsection of the DST forms the Beqaa Valley in Lebanon, separating the Mount Lebanon range from the Anti-Lebanon Mountains. Further south it is known as the Hula Valley separating the Galilee mountains and the Golan Heights.

The Jordan River begins here and flows southward through Lake Hula into the Sea of Galilee in Israel. The Rift then continues south through the Jordan Rift Valley into the Dead Sea on the Israeli-Jordanian border. From the Dead Sea southwards, the Rift is occupied by the Wadi Arabah, then the Gulf of Aqaba, and then the Red Sea.

Off the southern tip of Sinai in the Red Sea, the Dead Sea Transform meets the Red Sea Rift which runs the length of the Red Sea. The Red Sea Rift comes ashore to meet the East African Rift and the Aden Ridge in the Afar Depression of East Africa. The junction of these three rifts is called the Afar Triple Junction.

Africa

 

The East African Rift follows the Red Sea to the end before turning inland into the Ethiopian highlands, dividing the country into two large and adjacent but separate mountainous regions. In Kenya, Uganda, and the fringes of South Sudan, the Great Rift runs along two separate branches that are joined to each other only at their southern end, in Southern Tanzania along its border with Zambia. The two branches are called the Western Rift Valley and the Eastern Rift Valley.

The Western Rift, also called the Albertine Rift, is bordered by some of the highest mountains in Africa, including the Virunga Mountains, Mitumba Mountains, and Ruwenzori Range.

Much of this area lies within the boundaries of national parks such as Virunga National Park in the Democratic Republic of Congo, Rwenzori National Park and Queen Elizabeth National Park in Uganda, and Volcanoes National Park in Rwanda. Lake Victoria is considered to be part of the rift valley system although it actually lies between the two branches. All of the African Great Lakes were formed as the result of the rift, and most lie in territories within the rift.

In Kenya, the valley is deepest to the north of Nairobi. As the lakes in the Eastern Rift have no outlet to the sea and tend to be shallow, they have a high mineral content as the evaporation of water leaves the salts behind. For example, Lake Magadi has high concentrations of soda (sodium carbonate) and Lake Elmenteita, Lake Bogoria, and Lake Nakuru are all strongly alkaline, while the freshwater springs supplying Lake Naivasha are essential to support its current biological variety.

The southern section of the Rift Valley includes Lake Malawi, the third-deepest freshwater body in the world, which reaches  in depth and separates the Nyassa plateau of Northern Mozambique from Malawi; it ends in the Zambezi valley.

See also
Great Rift Valley, Ethiopia
Great Rift Valley, Kenya
Rift Valley fever
Rift Valley lakes
Rift Valley Province
Rift Valley Railways
Rift Valley Technical Training Institute
The Great Rift: Africa's Wild Heart, a BBC/Animal Planet production
Major earthquakes
1837 Galilee earthquake
1995 Gulf of Aqaba earthquake
2005 Lake Tanganyika earthquake
2006 Mozambique earthquake
2008 Lake Kivu earthquake

References

Further reading
Africa's Great Rift Valley, 2001, 
Tribes of the Great Rift Valley, 2007, 
East African Rift Valley lakes, 2006, 
Photographic atlas of the Mid-Atlantic Ridge Rift Valley, 1977, 
Rift Valley fever : an emerging human and animal problem, 1982, 
Rift valley: definition and geologic significance, Giacomo Corti (National Research Council of Italy, Institute of Geosciences and Earth Resources) – The Ethiopian Rift Valley, 2013, 
 Big crack is evidence that East Africa could be splitting in two, by Lucia Perez Diaz, CNN. Updated April 5, 2018

External links

Article on geology.com
Geological Structure

 

Rifts and grabens
Landforms of Africa
Landforms of the Middle East
Landforms of Israel
Landforms of Syria
Landforms of Egypt
Landforms of Lebanon
Landforms of Ethiopia
Landforms of Kenya
Landforms of Saudi Arabia
Landforms of Yemen
Landforms of Tanzania
Landforms of the Democratic Republic of the Congo
Landforms of Uganda
Landforms of Burundi
Geology of Israel
Geology of Syria
Geology of Egypt
Geology of Lebanon
Geology of Ethiopia
Geology of Kenya
Geology of Saudi Arabia
Geology of Yemen
Geology of Tanzania
Geology of the Democratic Republic of the Congo
Geology of Uganda
Geology of Burundi
Geology of Africa
Physiographic provinces